Mr and Mrs Howard Paul were the Victorian era husband and wife team of Henry Howard Paul (1830-1905), an American born writer, actor and mimic, and his wife  Mrs Howard Paul (1833-1879), a British actress and singer who created the role of Lady Sangazure in The Sorcerer (1877) by Gilbert and Sullivan.